Events from the year 1900 in Taiwan, Empire of Japan.

Incumbents

Central government of Japan
 Prime Minister – Yamagata Aritomo, Itō Hirobumi

Taiwan
 Governor-General – Kodama Gentarō

Events

Birth

References

 
Years of the 19th century in Taiwan